Maria Jongeling (born 19 June 1975 in Delft, Netherlands) is a Dutch road and track racing cyclist. As a junior, she won a gold medal at the Track World Championships in the individual pursuit. She also became three years in a row national track champion in the individual pursuit and won in the 1994 the Dutch National Time Trial Championships. She participated at the UCI Road World Championships in the time trial in 1994 and 1995 She is the older sister of Jet Jongeling, who won the Dutch National Time Trials in 1995.

Palmares

1993
1st Track World Championships, Individual pursuit (junior)
1st Dutch National Track Championships, Individual pursuit (elite)
2nd Dutch National Track Championships, Sprint (elite)
2nd Dutch National Track Championships, Points race (elite)

1994
1st, Dutch National Track Championships, Individual pursuit
2nd, Dutch National Track Championships, Points race
1st, Dutch National Time Trial Championships
5th, 1994 UCI Road World Championships, Time trial

1995
2nd, Dutch National Track Championships, 500 m time trial
1st, Dutch National Track Championships, Individual Pursuit
2nd, Dutch National Time Trial Championships
3rd, Dutch National Road Race Championships
14th, 1995 UCI Road World Championships, Time trial

References

External links

 

1975 births
Living people
Dutch female cyclists
Sportspeople from Delft
Dutch cycling time trial champions
Dutch track cyclists
Cyclists from South Holland
20th-century Dutch women